James Fridman is a British graphic designer known for taking requests on Twitter for alterations to photographs, but consistently responding with an image edited to comedically unexpected results — usually by taking specifications literally, invoking paraprosdokian humour. Many fans submit photos of themselves with a request to improve the image with photo editing, expecting a humorous result, to which Fridman replies. He and his work have been featured in various publications, such as Cosmopolitan, The Daily Telegraph, MTV, Huffington Post, Metro, BuzzFeed, Mashable and others regularly featuring articles on his latest work.

In October 2016, Fridman collaborated with Truth Initiative  a public health organization dedicated to smoking cessation.

In January 2018, he was nominated for Shorty Awards in the "Weird" category.

He established the James Fridman Foundation in December 2018 with a mission to help and support children and young people affected by social issues.

In March 2019, Fridman collaborated with online dating app Bumble to support the criminalization of unsolicited lewd photos, a campaign led by the Bumble Founder and CEO Whitney Wolfe Herd.

Fridman published Joy of Photoshop in 2021, with Welbeck Publishing.

References

External links 
James Fridman's website

Living people
British Internet celebrities
Designers from London
Year of birth missing (living people)
British graphic designers